Spring Hill Farm is a historic home located at Great Falls, Fairfax County, Virginia.  It was built about 1822, and is a -story, frame farmhouse dwelling in the Federal style.  A two-story rear wing was added in 1850.  A 19th century south wing was replaced in 1972.  Also on the property are two contributing barns, one apparently built before the American Civil War and one built in 1890.

It was listed on the National Register of Historic Places in 2002. It has since been demolished as of February 2014.

References

External links

Houses on the National Register of Historic Places in Virginia
Federal architecture in Virginia
Houses completed in 1822
Houses in Fairfax County, Virginia
National Register of Historic Places in Fairfax County, Virginia
1822 establishments in Virginia